WLIO, virtual and VHF digital channel 8, is a dual NBC/Fox-affiliated television station licensed to Lima, Ohio, United States. Owned by Block Communications, it is a sister station to low-powered, Class A dual ABC/CBS affiliate WOHL-CD (channel 35). The two stations share studios on Rice Avenue northwest of downtown; WLIO's transmitter is located on Saint Clair Avenue north of downtown.

History
The station signed on April 18, 1953, with the calls WLOK-TV. It aired an analog signal on UHF channel 73. The station was owned by WLOK, Inc., a company that had former Ohio State football great Lloyd A. Pixley as its president. The station was co-owned with WLOK radio (1240 AM and 103.3 FM). WLOK-TV carried programming from all four networks of the Golden Age of television (NBC, CBS, ABC, and DuMont). It would eventually lose secondary affiliations with DuMont in 1956, CBS in 1972, and ABC in 1982.

In 1952, Federal Communications Commission (FCC) files show two television construction permits for Lima. In addition to WLOK-TV on channel 73, Northwestern Ohio Broadcasting Corporation, owner of WIMA radio (1150 AM and 102.1 FM, now WIMT) and controlled by George E. Hamilton and Robert W. Mack, had applied for channel 35. After the death of Lloyd Pixley, WIMA bought the WLOK stations on April 24, 1955 to obtain WLOK-TV. Because FCC rules at that time forbade licensees from owning multiple AM or FM stations in the same market, the WLOK radio licenses were offered to Ohio Northern University, but the university declined due to the costs of operating them, and the licenses were surrendered to the FCC for cancellation. Northwestern Ohio Broadcasting Corporation then filed to modify WLOK-TV's license to specify operation on channel 35, supplanting its earlier construction permit, and changed its call letters to WIMA-TV to match its new radio sisters.

The WIMA stations were split up in 1971, with the radio stations going to Lima Broadcasting Corporation, while WIMA-TV went to Lima Communications Corporation (despite the similarity in names, the two companies were unrelated), owned by the Toledo Blade newspaper and Midwestern Broadcasting of Toledo. As the radio stations kept the WIMA call sign, channel 35 was renamed WLIO (as FCC rules at the time had a restriction on TV and radio stations in the same market, but different ownership using the same call letters). The new owners assumed control on February 1, 1972. In October 1982, Blade Communications (now Block Communications) bought out Midwestern Broadcasting and became sole owner of the station.  WLIO's digital signal on VHF channel 8 signed on November 18, 2002.

From late 1998 until September 18, 2006, WLIO operated cable-only WB affiliate "WBOH" in partnership with WB 100+. Specifically, this station performed sales and promotional duties for the cable-exclusive affiliate. After The WB and UPN merged in September 2006 to create The CW, "WBOH" became part of the new network as part of The CW Plus (under the West Central Ohio CW branding). WLIO launched a new second digital subchannel in order to offer non-cable subscribers access to the new network. On September 17, 2008, WLIO dropped The CW from its second digital subchannel and began transmitting NBC Weather Plus. The CW network reverted to cable-exclusive status in Lima. The cable channel slot was eventually taken over by WBDT from Dayton as the network's de facto affiliate.

On November 29, 2008, it was announced Metro Video Productions would sell its stations (WLQP-LP, WLMO-LP, and WOHL-CA in Lima, as well as WFND-LP in Findlay) to a Block Communications subsidiary, West Central Ohio Broadcasting. While Block assumed control of those station's operations after the sale's completion on February 5, 2009, it was initially stated the company would not close the WLQP/WLMO/WOHL facilities on South Central Avenue and consolidate them with WLIO. It has since been stated some consolidation would take place with the stations moving to WLIO's studios on Rice Avenue.

WLIO became digital-exclusive on June 12, 2009 after shutting down its analog signal on UHF channel 35. This cleared the way for WOHL-CA (channel 25) to change to digital on channel 35. The call letters were changed to WOHL-CD. On July 13, 2009, WLIO-DT2 became a primary Fox and secondary MyNetworkTV affiliate essentially becoming a second outlet in Lima for the two networks. WOHL-CA shut down its analog signal July 31, 2009. On September 28, 2009, WLQP terminated its analog operations and ABC programming was shifted to WOHL. Primary Fox and secondary MyNetworkTV programming seen on that station continued to be aired on WLIO-DT2 and cable.

Previously, WLIO-DT used Program and System Information Protocol to display its virtual channel as 35. However, when WOHL moved to digital channel 35 in August 2009, it began using virtual channel 35. Strictly followed, the PSIP standard and FCC rules require that WOHL-CD use virtual channel 8 in this situation, corresponding to WLIO's physical channel. However, WLIO moved to virtual channel 8 instead to avoid the conflict, since it doesn't interfere with WISH-TV in Indianapolis and WJW in Cleveland. Other stations (including KJRW in Eureka, California and formerly WOAY-TV in Oak Hill, West Virginia) have changed their virtual channel number to match their physical channel without asking the FCC for a waiver, avoiding sanctions as long as the desired channel is not otherwise in use in the service area. WOAY-TV has since reverted to its former analog channel number as its virtual channel number.

Digital television

Digital channels
The station's digital signal is multiplexed:

Programming
Syndicated programming on WLIO-DT1 includes Jeopardy!, Wheel of Fortune, Judge Judy, Entertainment Tonight, and Dr. Phil among others. Syndicated programming on WLIO-DT2 includes The People's Court, The Big Bang Theory, Maury, and Modern Family among others.

News operation
WLIO airs a one-hour morning broadcast at 6 a.m., which is simulcast on WOHL 35.1. WOHL-CD simulcasts WLIO news weeknights at 6 and 11 p.m. on both 35.1 (ABC) and 35.2 (CBS).

Weeknights WLIO produces two half-hour newscasts (at 5 and 10) on 8.2.  As 8.2 airs news at 5 p.m., it doesn't air on 8.1, which is a deviation from what has become common for "Big 3" network affiliates.

8.1 airs local news on weekend evenings, but unlike weekdays doesn't simulcast it on any of their sister stations or air any news on 8.2.

Past on-air staff
Adrian Cronauer was a staff announcer and personality at WIMA from 1965 until 1967. Before coming to Lima, his tour of duty in Vietnam and being a disk jockey on an Armed Forces radio station in Saigon later served as the inspiration for the 1987 Touchstone Pictures-released film Good Morning, Vietnam in which Cronauer was portrayed by Robin Williams.

See also
Channel 8 digital TV stations in the United States
Channel 8 virtual TV stations in the United States

References

External links
HometownStations.com - Official website

Television channels and stations established in 1953
1953 establishments in Ohio
LIO
NBC network affiliates